Rifah-e-Aam Press (also called Matba Rifah-i 'Am) was a publishing house in Lahore. It was established by Sayyid Mumtaz Ali in 1898. The last recorded book it published was Dastoor-ul-Amal Bhatta in 1935.

Publications
 Farhang e Asifiya
 Ma'arka Mazhab-o-Science, Zafar Ali Khan.
 Ma'athir al-kiram, Azad Bilgrami.

References

1898 establishments
Book publishing companies of India

External links
 Some publications of Rifah-e-Aam Press

Urdu-language books